Dustin Friesen (born March 1, 1983) is a Canadian former professional ice hockey player who played in the American Hockey League (AHL) and the Deutsche Eishockey Liga (DEL).

Playing career
Friesen played five seasons of college hockey at the University of New Brunswick before turning professional in 2009. He spent time with the ECHL's Utah Grizzlies and Idaho Steelheads, both of the ECHL, and the Bridgeport Sound Tigers of the AHL.

On September 22, 2011, Friesen signed a two-way contract with the Chicago Wolves of the AHL, before being optioned to the Missouri Mavericks, the Wolves' CHL affiliate. On October 7, 2011, Friesen was recalled by the Wolves from the Mavericks, before ever playing a game with the Mavericks.  On December 3, 2011, Friesen was optioned by the Wolves to the Mavericks again.  On December 6, 2011, Friesen was recalled by the Wolves from the Mavericks for a second time.

In the 2012–13 season, Friesen opted to pursue a European career, and signed a contract with German club, the Fischtown Pinguins of the 2nd Bundesliga. Dustin re-signed for a second season with the Pinguins after he was voted the Best Defenseman of the league for the season.

After two successful years in the DEL2, Friesen attracted the attention of the top level German league, and signed a one-year contract with DEL club, ERC Ingolstadt on June 10, 2014.

Friesen enjoyed six years with Iserlohn, captaining the club in his final two seasons before leaving as a free agent following the interrupted 2019–20 season from to the COVID-19 pandemic. On April 3, 2019, Friesen was signed to extend his career in the DEL with a one-year contract agreed with the Iserlohn Roosters.

With the on-going COVID pandemic complicating family considerations and having secured the opportunity to pursue a career in coaching near his hometown in Saskatchewan, Friesen before beginning his contract with Iserlohn, abruptly announced his retirement after 11 professional seasons on August 12, 2020.

Career statistics

References

External links

1983 births
Living people
Bridgeport Sound Tigers players
Canadian expatriate ice hockey players in Germany
Canadian ice hockey centres
Chicago Wolves players
Fischtown Pinguins players
Idaho Steelheads (ECHL) players
ERC Ingolstadt players
Missouri Mavericks players
Swift Current Broncos players
Utah Grizzlies (AHL) players